Ibembo is a village on the Itimbiri River in the Tshopo province of the Democratic Republic of the Congo.

History

Ibembo was among the posts founded in 1890 by a Belgian expedition led by Léon Roget.
Joseph Duvivier was placed in charge.
Later, Ibembo was connected to Buta and Djabir by a railway track.

Jacques Mbali, Bishop of Buta, was born in Ibembo in 1921.

Notes

Sources

Populated places in Tshopo